The 2017–18 season of the Norwegian Premier League, the highest bandy league for men in Norway.

Eighteen games were played, with 2 points given for wins and 1 for draws. Solberg won the league, whereas Hamar were relegated and Konnerud survived a relegation playoff.

League table

References

Seasons in Norwegian bandy
2017 in bandy
2018 in bandy
Band
Band